Peter Christopher was an associate professor at Georgia Southern University.  Christopher was a highly acclaimed author, and had written numerous books.

Christopher also served as a writer-in-residence for the Writers Voice Workshop, and lectured at the University of Florida, Columbia University, and New York University. He joined the faculty of the Georgia Southern Writing and Linguistics Department in 1998, where he helped build the creative writing program. He also was a guest teacher for the dangerous writers in Portland, OR.

Christopher died on April 15, 2008, due to liver cancer.

Bibliography

Collections 
Campfires of the Dead (1989)
Campfires of the Dead and the Living (2022)

Education 
 Masters in Fine Arts from the University of Florida in 1996.
 Bachelors in Literature from Columbia University in 1978.

Awards 
Christopher received a National Endowment for the Arts Fellowship in Literature.

References 
Columbia University info
University of Florida info about alumni
Link to story by Christopher

Footnotes 

University of Florida alumni
Columbia University alumni
1956 births
2008 deaths